Isaac Roosevelt may refer to:
Isaac Roosevelt (politician) (1726–1794), New York City revolutionary and politician
Isaac Roosevelt (businessman) (1790–1863), merchant, grandson of the politician